Brislington Football Club is a football club based in Brislington, in Bristol, England.

History
The club was established in 1956 as an under-16 team, and initially played in the Bristol Church of England League. They won the Somerset Intermediate Cup in 1961–62 and 1962–63, and the Somerset Junior Cup in 1963–64. By 1965 the club were playing in the Senior Division of the Bristol & Suburban League, and during the 1970s they moved up to the Somerset County League. They won the League Cup in 1976–77, and finished as runners-up in the Premier Division in 1979–80, 1983–84 and 1984–85. The club went on to win the Premier Division and the Somerset Senior Cup in 1988–89, and after finishing as runners-up and winning the Senior Cup in 1990–91, they were promoted to Division One of the Western League.

Brisligton won the Somerset Senior Cup again in 1992–93, and after a third-place finish in Division One in 1993–94, they won both Division One and the Senior Cup the following season and were promoted to the Premier Division. After winning the Somerset Premier Cup in 1995–96, the club were Premier Division runners-up in 2002–03 and again in 2012–13.

Ground

After being reformed in 1956, the club initially played on a pitch at Arnos Court Park. They now play at the Brislington Stadium on Ironmould Lane, which has a capacity of 3,000, which includes a 150-seat Colin Arnold Memorial Grandstand.

Honours
Western League
Division One champions 1994–95
Somerset County League
Champions 1988–89
League Cup winners 1976–77
Somerset Premier Cup
Winners 1995–96
Somerset Senior Cup
Winners 1988–89, 1990–91, 1992–93, 1994–95
Somerset Intermediate Cup
Winners 1961–62, 1962–63
Somerset Junior Cup
Winners 1963–64

Records
Best FA Cup performance: Fourth qualifying round, 2013–14
Best FA Vase performance: Fourth round, 2004–05

See also
Brislington F.C. players

References

External links

Official website

Football clubs in England
Football clubs in Bristol
Association football clubs established in 1956
1956 establishments in England
Bristol and Avon Association Football League
Bristol and Suburban Association Football League
Somerset County League
Western Football League